The Echkar Formation is a geological formation comprising sandstones and claystones in the Agadez Region of Niger, central Africa.

Description 
Its strata date back to the Late Albian to Late Cretaceous (Cenomanian stages, about 100-95 million years ago). Dinosaur remains are among the fossils that have been recovered from the formation.

Fossil content

Vertebrates

See also 
 List of dinosaur-bearing rock formations
 Lists of fossiliferous stratigraphic units in Africa
 List of fossiliferous stratigraphic units in Niger
 Geology of Niger

References

Bibliography

Further reading 
 A. F. d. Lapparent. 1953. Gisements de Dinosauriens dans le "Continental intercalaire" d'In Abangarit (Sahara méridional) [Dinosaur localities in the "Continental Intercalaire" of In Abangarit (southern Sahara)]. Comptes Rendus de l'Académie des Sciences à Paris 236:1905-1906
 P. C. Sereno, J. A. Wilson, and J. L. Conrad. 2004. New dinosaurs link southern landmasses in the mid-Cretaceous. Proceedings of the Royal Society of London B 271(1546):1325-1330

Geologic formations of Niger
Lower Cretaceous Series of Africa
Upper Cretaceous Series of Africa
Cretaceous Niger
Albian Stage
Cenomanian Stage
Sandstone formations
Shale formations
Fluvial deposits
Lacustrine deposits
Paleontology in Niger
Formations